Wu Se-hwa (born 9 July 1955) is a Taiwanese politician who was the Minister of Education in the Executive Yuan of Taiwan from 2014 to 2016.

Education
Wu obtained his bachelor's degree in communication engineering from National Chiao Tung University and master's and doctoral degrees from National Chengchi University (NCCU) in business administration in 1979 and 1984, respectively, with specialization in strategic management and knowledge management creativity.

Early career
In 1983–1984, Wu was an instructor at NCCU. In 1984, he was promoted to become an associate professor and subsequently a professor in 1989 onward. In 1990–1994, he was the vice dean of the Center for Public and Business Administration Education. In 1994, he founded and became the director of the Graduate Institute of Technology Innovation Management until 1999. In 1999–2005, he became the dean of the College of Commerce. In 2005–2006, he became the director of Center for Creativity and Innovation Studies. And finally in 2006-2014 he became the president of NCCU.

References

Taiwanese Ministers of Education
Living people
1955 births
National Chengchi University alumni
Academic staff of the National Chengchi University
Fulbright alumni